The Northern Cambria School District is a small, rural, public school district located in northwestern Cambria County in Pennsylvania. The district encompasses: the borough of Northern Cambria along with Barr and Susquehanna Township. The geographic area is just . According to 2000 federal census data, it serves a resident population of 8,342. By 2010, the federal census data found the district resident population had declined to 7,898 people. The educational attainment levels for the Northern Cambria School District population (25 years old and over) were 85.7% high school graduates and 16.2% college graduates. The district is one of the 500 public school districts of Pennsylvania.

According to the Pennsylvania Budget and Policy Center, 41.9% of the district's pupils lived at 185% or below the Federal Poverty Level  as shown by their eligibility for the federal free or reduced price school meal programs in 2012. In 2009, the district residents’ per capita income was $13,144, while the median family income was $32,989. In the Commonwealth, the median family income was $49,501 and the United States median family income was $49,445, in 2010. In Cambria County, the median household income was $39,574. By 2013, the median household income in the United States rose to $52,100.

Northern Cambria School District operates: Northern Cambria High School and Northern Cambria Elementary/Middle School. Students in grades K-8 attend the elementary/middle school while students in grades 9-12 attend the high school. High school students may choose to attend Admiral Peary Area Vocational Technical School for training in the construction and mechanical trades. The Appalachia Intermediate Unit IU8 provides the district with a wide variety of services like specialized education for disabled students and hearing, background checks for employees, state mandated recognizing and reporting child abuse training, speech and visual disability services and professional development for staff and faculty.

Extracurriculars
The district offers a wide variety of clubs, activities and an extensive, publicly funded sports program.

Athletics
The Northern Cambria teams are call the Colts with the school colors being black and gold. The black color was adopted from the previous Barnesboro High School and the gold from Spangler High School. The Northern Cambria Track and Sports Complex (Charles Miller Track) is located behind the high school. The school football field is not at the high school, but at a site about one mile away. The school's girls volleyball team won the PIAA A state championship in 2005, 2009, 2018 & 2019. The boys basketball team won the PIAA Class B state championship in 1965.

Northern Cambria High School offers the following PIAA sports:
Varsity

Boys
Baseball - A
Basketball-  AA
Cross country - A
Football - A
Golf - AA
Rifle - AAAA
Swimming and diving - AA
Track and field - AA
Volleyball - AA
Wrestling - AA

Girls
Basketball - AA
Cheer - AAAA
Cross country - A
Golf
Rifle - AAAA
Softball - AAA
Swimming and diving - AA
Track and field - AA
Volleyball - A

Middle school sports:

Boys
Basketball
Football
Track and field
Wrestling 

Girls
Basketball
Track and field
Volleyball

According to PIAA directory July 2015

In 2014, Northern Cambria School District discontinued offering its own wrestling team due to a lack of participation. Students can access a wrestling program through a cooperative program with Cambria Heights School District.

District 6 championships

Northern Cambria competes in District 6 of the PIAA. In most sports, Northern Cambria is either in the A or AA classification. District championships include:

 Boys A basketball 2012
 Boys AA volleyball 2011
 Girls A volleyball 2010
 Girls AA track and field 2010
 Girls A volleyball 2009
 Girls AA track and field 2009
 Girls A volleyball 2008
 Girls AA track and field 2008
 Girls AA basketball 2008

 Girls A volleyball 2007
 Girls AA track and field 2007
 Girls A volleyball 2006
 Girls A volleyball 2005
 Girls A volleyball 2004
 Girls A softball 2003
 Boys AA basketball 2001
 Boys B basketball 1965
 Boys B basketball 1964

PIAA state team championships

2009 girls volleyball state champion - Class A
The 2009 girls volleyball team won the PIAA championship at the A classification, defeating Reading Holy Name 3 sets to 0. They defeated  Nativity BVM 3 sets to 0 in the state semifinals. The championships were held at Central York High School.

2005 girls volleyball state champion - Class A
The 2005 girls volleyball team won the PIAA championship at the A classification, defeating the Marian Catholic Fillies 25–8, 26–24, 25–13. They defeated the Reading Central Catholic Cardinals 22–25, 25–16, 25–17, 25–15 in the state semifinals. The championships were held at Central York High School. Northern Cambria finished the year with a record of 27–0.

1965 boys basketball state champion - Class B
In 1965 the boys basketball team (competing in Class B) won the school's first state championship, defeating the representative from Eastern Pennsylvania, Montrose, by a score of 78 to 69. The game was played at the Pitt Field House on the campus of the University of Pittsburgh. Montrose was the defending state champions and also came into the game with a 53-game unbeaten streak. The Colts' victory ended Montrose's bid to tie the state record for consecutive wins. Northern Cambria finished the year with a record of 27–1, with their lone loss coming to DeMatha Catholic High School of Maryland.

PIAA state championship playoff appearances

2011 boys A basketball round of 16
The 2011 team became the first boys basketball team at the school to win a boys state basketball playoff game in over 40 years. They beat Union (Rimersburg) in the first round. Tony Rocco led the Colts that game with 20 points and 11 steals. In the round of 16 they lost to Rocky Grove.

2010 boys A basketball round of 32
The 2010 team won the Heritage Conference and playoffs looked bright. However, in the first round they played Reading Central Catholic, the favored team in the state tournament to win. They kept the game close with a gap of just 7 going into the 4th quarter, but Reading deemed too much for the Colts. Northern Cambria shot a horrid 9%(3-31) from the 3-pt line, usually their specialty, or they might have pulled off the upset. Marcus Dawkins, a member of Reading Central Catholic, threw the ball off the backboard to himself on a fast break and dunked it. This team also won the Cambria Heights Christmas basketball tournament in 2009. Named to the all-tourney team was Anthony Penksa, Josh Stiles, and Tony Rocco.

2008 girls AA basketball state runner-up
The 2008 team became the first girls basketball team at the school to make the state playoffs. In the first round (the round of 32), NC defeated District 7's #7 seed Beaver 56–47. In the second round, they defeated District 7's #4 seed Ford City 54–18. NC defeated District 10's #2 seed Girard in the state quarterfinals 41–30 at Slippery Rock. In the Western Final, the Colts defeated District 6 rival Bishop McCort 45–42. They lost in the state final to York Catholic 52–40 at the Bryce Jordan Center in State College. In the District 6 playoffs, NC defeated Southern Huntingdon 60–48 in the semifinals and then defeated Bishop McCort in the District 6 championship 65–48 at the War Memorial in Johnstown.

2006 girls A volleyball state runner-up
The Colts finished as state runners-up in A volleyball in 2006. Northern Cambria defeated District 7 champion Geibel Catholic in the state semifinals, defeating the Gators 25–22, 21–25, 21–25, 25–21, 15–10. The Colts then lost to Reading Central Catholic 25–22, 25–12, 25–15 in the state championship game. The championships were held at Central York High School. It was the third straight year that Northern Cambria made it to the championship match in girls volleyball (they won the title in 2005).

2004 girls A volleyball state runner-up
In 2004, Northern Cambria defeated Reading Central Catholic 25–21, 19–25, 25–20, 26–24 in the state semifinals. They then lost in the finals to district 10 champion Cochranton 25–17, 25–23, 25–20. The championships were held at Robert Morris University outside of Pittsburgh.

2007 girls A volleyball state semifinalist
The volleyball team continued its success in 2007. This time, however, the Colts fell in the state semifinals, losing to the Cochranton Cardinals, the District 10 champion, 3 sets to 1. The championships were held at Central York High School.

2006 girls A softball state semifinalist
In 2006, the Northern Cambria softball team reached the state's final four. The Colts lost to eventual state champion Blue Ridge in the state semifinals. The game was played in Williamsport, PA. Northern Cambria lost the District 6 championship that year to Southern Huntingdon. They rebounded, however, by defeating Northern Bedford and East Juniata to reach the final four. The Colts played in the "eastern" half of the state bracket.

2003 girls A softball state semifinalist
In 2003, the Colts softball team lost to Chartiers-Houston in the state semifinals. Northern Cambria lost a 1–0 lead late in the game and lost 2–1 in eight innings. The Colts won the school's first District 6 championship in girls sports by defeating Southern Huntingdon. They then defeated Northern Bedford and Leechburg to reach the state semifinals. Northern Cambria defeated Leechburg 1–0 in 13 innings. The Colts played in the "western" half of the state bracket.

2008 girls A volleyball state quarterfinalist
Northern Cambria advanced to the state tournament by defeating Bishop Guilfoyle in 3 sets to 0 sets to win the District 6 championship for the 5th straight year. They then defeated Elderton in the first round of the state playoffs in a 5 set match. In this match-up, Elderton won the first two sets but NC rallied to take it in 5. The quarterfinal round (final 8) was played at Central York High School. The Colts finished fourth in their pool (North Star, Maplewood, and Reading Holy Name) and did not advance to the semifinals.

2009 girls A basketball state quarterfinalist
The girls basketball team finished 2nd in District 6, losing to Bishop Guilfoyle High School in the d6A finals. In the first round of states, they defeated Lancaster Country Day at Central Cambria High School. They then rallied to defeat Tri-Valley High School at Big Springs High School. In the final 8, they lost a nail-biter to Benton High School.

2009 girls A softball state quarterfinalist
The girls softball team defeated Bishop Guilfoyle High School in the District 6 semifinals to earn a state playoff bid. They lost the d6 championship to Claysburg-Kimmel High School. In the first round of the state playoffs, the Colts defeated Fannett-Metal High School 4–3 at Everett High School. In the final 8, they lost to Vincentian Academy 7–3.

2007 boys A basketball first round - round of 32
The boys basketball team made the PIAA playoffs by finishing fourth in District 6 A. The team lost to Harmony in the district semifinals. They then lost to Saltsburg in the consolation game. In the first round of the state playoffs, the team lost to defending PIAA A champion Elk County Catholic.

2002 boys AA basketball first round - round of 32
In 2002, the boys basketball team made the state playoffs for the third straight year. The team lost to District 5's North Star. The team lost to Tyrone in the District 6 semifinals but defeated Homer Center to finish 3rd in District 6.

2001 boys AA basketball first round - round of 32
The 2001 basketball team won the District 6 AA championship by defeating Westmont Hilltop. They lost in the first round of the state playoffs to district 7's Wilkinsburg.

2000 boys AA basketball first round - round of 32

PIAA individual champions

Janae Dunchack has won four individual state gold medals in the high jump competition in track and field. 
Gus Yahner 2014 PIAA pole vault state champion.

Conference affiliation

Northern Cambria's athletic teams compete in the Heritage Conference. Most of the schools in this conference are in Indiana County. The conference consists of the following teams:
The Blairsville High School Bobcats
The Homer-Center High School Wildcats
The Ligonier Valley High School Rams (Westmoreland County)
The Marion Center High School Stingers
The Northern Cambria High School Colts (Cambria County)
The Penns Manor High School Comets
The Purchase Line High School Dragons
The Saltsburg High School Trojans
The United High School Lions

Recent conference championships include:
 2012 boys basketball
 2010 boys basketball
 2010 girls volleyball
 2010 girls track and field
 2010 boys basketball
 2009 girls volleyball
 2009 girls track and field
 2009 girls basketball
 2008 girls volleyball
 2008 girls track and field
 2008 girls basketball
 2007 girls volleyball
 2007 girls track and field
 2007 girls basketball (shared with Penns Manor)
 2007 boys basketball (shared with Blairsville)
 2006 girls volleyball
 2006 girls track and field
 2006 girls basketball
 2005 girls volleyball
 2005 girls track and field
 2005 girls softball
 2004 girls volleyball
 2004 girls track and field
 2004 girls softball
 2003 girls softball
 2003 girls track and field
 2003 girls basketball (shared with Marion Center)

References

External links
Northern Cambria School District website
Northern Cambria community website
2004 PIAA A Volleyball Bracket
2005 PIAA A Volleyball Bracket
2006 PIAA A Volleyball Bracket
NCSD 2005 Volleyball Page
PIAA District 6 website
PIAA website

School districts in Cambria County, Pennsylvania